Seven Oaks or Sevenoaks may refer to:

Canada
 Seven Oaks (electoral district), in Winnipeg, 1956–89
 Seven Oaks General Hospital, Winnipeg
 Seven Oaks School Division
 Seven Oaks House Museum
 Seven Oaks Sportsplex
 Battle of Seven Oaks (1816)
 Morningside, Toronto, alternate name for the neighbourhood

United States
(by state)
 Seven Oaks Dam, California
 Seven Oaks Reservoir, California
 Seven Oaks (Dahlonega, Georgia), listed on the NRHP in Georgia
 Seven Oaks (Sac City, Iowa), listed on the NRHP
 Seven Oaks, Maryland
 Seven Oaks Estate, Palisades, New York, listed on the NRHP
 Seven Oaks (Asheville, North Carolina), listed on the NRHP
 Seven Oaks, Bluffton, South Carolina
 Seven Oaks, South Carolina
 Seven Oaks, Texas
 Seven Oaks Farm and Black's Tavern, Greenwood, Virginia, listed on the NRHP

United Kingdom
 Sevenoaks, a Commuter town in Kent, England
 Sevenoaks (district)
 Sevenoaks (UK Parliament constituency)
 Sevenoaks railway station
 Sevenoaks Preparatory School
 Sevenoaks School
 Sevenoaks Town F.C.
 Sevenoaks Wildlife Reserve
 Sevenoaks Weald, a village in Kent